This is a list of the 2019 RFL Championship season results. The Championship is the second-tier rugby league competition in the United Kingdom. The season is scheduled to begin on February 3.

The regular season will be played over 27 round-robin fixtures, where each of the fourteen teams involved in the competition play each other, once at home and once away. Teams will also play one extra match on the Summer Bash Weekend.

The play-offs will commence after the round-robin fixtures. The top 5 teams will play against each other to determine who get promoted. In the first round of the play-offs 4th place will verse 5th in a elimination final while 2nd place will verse 3rd place in a qualifying final. The second round of the play-offs will then have the winner of the elimination final verse the loser of the qualifying final and 1st place verse the winner of the qualifying final in a match that will give the winning team a spot in the championship play-off. Round three then has the winner of the 1st semi-final versus the loser of the 2nd semi-final as a preliminary play-off. Then comes the championship play-off where the winner of the 2nd semi-final versus the winner of the preliminary final.

The bottom two teams get relegated to League 1.

Regular season 
All times are UK local time (UTC or UTC+1) on the relevant dates.

Round 1

Round 2

Round 3

Round 4

Round 5

Round 6

Round 7

Round 8

Round 9

Round 10

Round 11

Round 12

Round 13

Round 14

Round 15

Round 16

Round 17

Round 18

Round 19

Round 20

Round 21

Round 22

Round 23

Round 24

Round 25

Round 26

Round 27

Play-offs

Elimination and Qualifying Finals

Semi-finals

Preliminary Final

Championship play-off final

References 

RFL Championship results